is a Japanese footballer who plays as a defender. He has represented the Japan U17 and Japan U23 youth teams internationally. He is also eligible to represent the United States.

Club career
Born in Yokosuka, Kanagawa to a Japanese mother and American father of Jamaican descent, Chase moved to Texas at the age of three, spending nine years before returning to Japan. While in the United States, Chase also played basketball, and started his football career as a forward.

Having trained with Dutch side AZ Alkmaar and German side VfB Stuttgart, Chase has aimed to pursue a career overseas. He was also reportedly scouted by Dutch giants Ajax.

On 7 April 2022, Chase signed a contract with VfB Stuttgart II that comes into effect on 1 July 2022.

International career
Chase has represented Japan up to under-23 level. He trained with the senior team in 2022. He was praised by coach Hajime Moriyasu for his talent and potential.

References

2004 births
Living people
Japanese people of American descent
Japanese people of Jamaican descent
Association football people from Kanagawa Prefecture
Japanese footballers
Association football defenders
Japan youth international footballers